S.S.C. Napoli once again struggled to reach the levels it had achieved previously , but still finished sixth in Serie A, which ended up with coach Marcello Lippi joining Juventus. Financial woes caused Napoli to sell its two prominent foreign players, Jonas Thern and Daniel Fonseca to Roma following the season's end.Skipper Ciro Ferrara also left, in his case for Juventus.

Squad

Goalkeepers
  Giuseppe Taglialatela
  Raffaele Di Fusco
  Angelo Pagotto

Defenders
  Ciro Ferrara
  Giovanni Francini
  Fabio Cannavaro
  Giancarlo Corradini
  Massimo Tarantino
  Carlo Cornacchia
  Sebastiano Nela
  Ciro Caruso
  Alessandro Sbrizzo
  Giovanni Bia
  Enzo Gambaro

Midfielders
  Jonas Thern
  Fausto Pari
  Roberto Policano
  Fabio Pecchia
  Renato Buso
  Eugenio Corini
  Mario Caruso
  Roberto Bordin
  Luca Altomare

Attackers
  Carmelo Imbriani
  Paolo Di Canio
  Daniel Fonseca
  Giorgio Bresciani

Transfers

Winter

Competitions

Serie A

League table

Results by round

Matches

Topscorers
  Daniel Fonseca 15
  Paolo Di Canio 5
  Fabio Pecchia 4
  Renato Buso 4

Coppa Italia

Second round

Other tournaments

Carlos Menem Trophy

Statistics

Players statistics

References

Sources
  RSSSF - Italy 1993/94

S.S.C. Napoli seasons
Napoli